Park Road 36 (PR 36) is a  Park Road in the U.S. state of Texas maintained by the Texas Department of Transportation (TxDOT). The road, located in northwestern Palo Pinto County west of Graford, was authorized in 1945 to provide access to a former section of Possum Kingdom State Park. PR 36 has since been extended to two private campgrounds connecting them to State Highway 16 (SH 16) while intersecting FM 2951 and FM 2353.

Route description
PR 36 begins at the main entrance for the Boy Scouts of America camp, Camp Constantin, and the YMCA camp, Camp Grady Spruce; the main road of the highway travels through the former. The highway travels in close proximity to Possum Kingdom Lake's southern shore, before reaching FM 2951. The highway turns towards the east, traveling through the small town of Pickwick where it intersects FM 2353.

History
PR 36 was originally designated in 1945 over an approximately  segment connecting a former portion of Possum Kingdom State Park to SH 16. The road was extended  westward to the Lakeview subdivision a year later. The final  extension to the current western terminus at the organizational campgrounds was added in 1947.

Major intersections

See also

References

External links

0036
Transportation in Palo Pinto County, Texas